Wilkesboro is a town in and the county seat of Wilkes County, North Carolina, United States. The population was 3,687 at the 2020 census. The town is located along the south bank of the Yadkin River, directly opposite the town of North Wilkesboro. Wilkesboro is a Small Town Main Street community and has recently revitalized its historic downtown to include the Carolina West Wireless Community Commons, Wilkes Communications Pavilion, Heritage Square and Splash Pad. Cub Creek Park is adjacent to the downtown and contains many amenities, which include baseball, walking trails, mountain biking trails, trout fishing, dog park, basketball, tennis, and pickleball courts, picnic shelters, etc. Wilkesboro is also the home of the annual MerleFest, Carolina in the Fall, and Brushy Mountain Peach & Heritage festivals.

History 
Wilkesboro was founded in 1800 and quickly designated as the county seat. The town is built atop a low, broad ridge which runs for over a mile along the south bank of the Yadkin River. For many decades a popular historic spot in Wilkesboro was the "Tory Oak", a large oak tree from which Colonel Benjamin Cleveland, a well-known Wilkes County patriot during the American Revolutionary War, hanged Loyalist militia leaders who supported the British King and opposed American independence from Britain. The oak was located behind the old Wilkes County courthouse. During the Civil War, many of Wilkesboro's residents remained loyal to the Union and opposed the Confederacy.  In March 1865 General George Stoneman, a Union cavalry leader, led a raid through the town. Shortly after the war ended, Tom Dula (Dooley), a Confederate veteran, was tried and hanged for the murder of his fiancée, Laura Foster. Many people were convinced that one of Dula's jealous ex-girlfriends murdered Foster, and that Dula was innocent of the crime. Dula's story was turned into a top-selling ballad in 1958 by the Kingston Trio, the title of which was Tom Dooley. The story was subsequently turned into a 1959 movie starring Michael Landon as Dula, and each summer the Wilkes Playmakers present a popular play based on the story.

The Robert Cleveland Log House, Downtown Wilkesboro Historic District, Federal Building, J. T. Ferguson Store, Thomas B. Finley Law Office, J. L. Hemphill House, Johnson-Hubbard House, Old Wilkes County Jail, St. Paul's Episcopal Church and Cemetery, Wilkes County Courthouse, Wilkesboro Presbyterian Church, and Wilkesboro-Smithey Hotel are listed on the National Register of Historic Places.

Demographics

2020 census

As of the 2020 United States census, there were 3,687 people, 1,386 households, and 808 families residing in the town.

2010 census
As of the 2010 census, there were 3,413 people living in Wilkesboro. The population density was 622.5 people per square mile (14.2/km). The racial makeup of Wilkesboro was 81.5% White, 8.9% African American, 3.0% Asian, 0.2% Native American, 0.2% Pacific Islander, 4.0% from other races, and 2.3% from two or more races.

The population of Wilkesboro was spread out, with 21.7% being under the age of 20, 6.1% from 20-24, 21.9% from 25-44, 25.6% from 45-64, and 24.5% being 65 and over. The median age was 45.2 years old, more specifically 40.8 for males and 49.5 for females.

Economy
Wilkesboro's largest industry is the Tyson Foods poultry processing plant; it is one of the largest poultry plants east of the Mississippi River.

Local communication companies, Wilkes Communications and Carolina West Wireless are based in Wilkesboro.

Lowe's has a call center and satellite corporate office in Wilkesboro. The company employs approximately 2,000 people at its campus in Wilkesboro.

Education
Wilkesboro is served by the Wilkes County Schools system. Most of Wilkesboro's high school students attend Wilkes Central High School; it is located in the adjacent community of Moravian Falls. Wilkes Early College, based at Wilkes Community College, and one charter school, Bridges Charter School in State Road, North Carolina, offer other high-school options to Wilkesboro's students. Middle school students in Wilkesboro attend Central Wilkes Middle School, located in Moravian Falls, while the elementary schools that serve the town are Wilkesboro Elementary, Moravian Falls Elementary, and CC Wright Elementary.

Wilkesboro is the home of Wilkes Community College, a public, coed, two-year college within the North Carolina Community College System. The college's enrollment is typically around 3,500 students.

Media

Wilkesboro is served by a few media sources based in nearby North Wilkesboro. The Record of Wilkes is published weekly and Journal-Patroit is also published weekly. Wilkes County's two largest radio stations are broadcast from North Wilkesboro: WKBC-FM (97.3 FM) broadcasts Adult Contemporary (hot AC) and WKBC (AM) (800 AM) broadcasts American Country music.

Transportation

Public transportation
WTA, Wilkes Transportation Authority, is a local shuttle service based in Wilkesboro that utilizes vans and buses to serve Wilkes County. Fares range from $2-$24, but are typically around $4. There is scheduled shuttle service that runs every hour roughly and unscheduled service that allows for riders to request a van pick up in any part of the county.

Intercity Bus
Daily bus service is available on Greyhound. Sunway buses are advertised as Greyhound Express buses and the bus stop is in front of the Former Federal Building located at 207 West Main Street, Wilkesboro. Bus service goes to Boone, NC and Greensboro, NC, known as the Mountaineer East/West line with prices as low as $4. Passengers can connect to Greyhound services throughout the East Coast via the J. Douglas Galyon Depot where the line ends.

Major Highways

Politics and religion
Like most of Wilkes County, Wilkesboro has long been a bastion of the Republican Party.  Wilkesboro's largest religious group are the Southern Baptists, but the town does contain substantial numbers of Methodists, Presbyterians, Lutherans, and Episcopalians. The first two churches to be established in Wilkes County were built in Wilkesboro; they were missionary churches for the Episcopal and Presbyterian denominations. The nearby town of North Wilkesboro contains Wilkes County's only Roman Catholic church: a parish church named for Saint John Baptist de la Salle, and part of the Roman Catholic Diocese of Charlotte.

Attractions
MerleFest
W. Kerr Scott Dam and Reservoir
Carolina West Wireless Community Commons
Wilkes Communications Pavilion
Heritage Square Splash Pad
Wilkes Heritage Museum
Rolling Pines Disc Golf Course
Wilkesboro Sundial
Wilkes Community College
Ben Long Frescoes at St. Paul’s Episcopal Church
Cub Creek Park and Mountain Biking Trails
Hidden Oaks Dog Park
Blue Ridge Artisan Center at The 1915 Building
Yadkin River Greenway
North Wilkesboro Speedway

Notable people
Rhoda Bryan Billings, law professor and jurist, the second woman to serve as Chief Justice of the North Carolina Supreme Court
 Chang and Eng Bunker, the original Siamese twins
 Zach Galifianakis, stand-up comedian and character actor
 Deneen Graham, first black woman to be crowned Miss North Carolina in 1983
 Richard N. Hackett, Congressional Representative from 1907 to 1909
 Jim Hamby, former MLB player
 Junior Johnson, former NASCAR driver who tallied 50 wins in his career
 Montford Stokes, former United States Senator and 25th Governor of North Carolina

References

External links

Towns in Wilkes County, North Carolina
Towns in North Carolina
County seats in North Carolina
Populated places established in 1800